"Calling Your Name" is a song by Swedish musician Bo Martin Erik Erikson, known under the pseudonym of E-Type. It features backing vocals by Swedish singers Nana Hedin and Jessica Folcker, and is produced by E-Type and Kristian Lundin. Released in 1996 as the second single from his second album, The Explorer (1996), it was a hit in several countries, particularly in Sweden where it reached number four. The song stayed on the Swedish chart for 8 weeks, from 23 November to 25 January. In the UK, it was the first single release by E-Type reaching the top ten in the club charts. In the US, the music video of the song aired on MTV and it peaked at number 17 on the Billboard Hot Dance Club Play chart. The video featured Swedish actor Per Oscarsson, who plays a priest.

In 2011 Swedish singer Mikael Wiehe performed a cover of "Calling Your Name", translated to Swedish as "Jag ropar ditt namn" in the Swedish reality television show "Så mycket bättre".

Critical reception
Pan-European magazine Music & Media wrote, "The Swedish E-Type comes up with a midtempo dance track. The original radio edit is reminiscent of Ace of Base, whereas The Antiloop Garage radio edit delivers more drive."

Music video
The accompanying music video for "Calling Your Name" is filmed in a church. E-Type plays as the bridegroom that is going to be married. He stands by the altar, by a priest (played by renowned Swedish actor Per Oscarsson), waiting for his bride to arrive at the church. The bride arrives and walks down the aisle holding hands with her father. The church is crowded. When the priest asks the man if he wants to marry his bride, E-Type changes his mind and runs out of the church. The bride is left in shock by the altar, crying by the priest. The video doesn't feature Nana Hedin or Jessica Folcker.

"Calling Your Name" was later published on E-Type's official YouTube channel in March 2016, and had generated more than 4.1 million views as of January 2023.

Track listing
 12" single, Sweden
"Calling Your Name" (Pierre J's Q-Type Mix) – 5:47
"Calling Your Name" (Radio Edit) – 3:35
"Calling Your Name" (Antiloop Garage Club Mix) – 5:42
"Calling Your Name" (Antiloop Garage Radio Mix) – 3:55 

 CD single, Europe
"Calling Your Name" (Radio Edit) – 3:35
"This Is the Way" (UK Knife & Fork Euro Edit) – 3:47 

 CD maxi, UK
"Calling Your Name" (Radio Edit) – 3:35
"Calling Your Name" (Pierre J's Q-Type Mix) – 5:47
"Calling Your Name" (Antiloop Garage Radio Mix) – 3:55
"Calling Your Name" (Antiloop Garage Club Mix) – 5:42

Charts

Weekly charts

Year-end charts

References

 

1996 singles
1996 songs
English-language Swedish songs
E-Type (musician) songs
Nana Hedin songs
Stockholm Records singles